Hellinsia magnus is a moth of the family Pterophoridae. It is found in Ecuador.

The wingspan is 46 mm for males and 58 mm for females. The forewings are ferruginous-ochreous and the markings are brown. The hindwings are shining grey-brown and the fringes pale brown-grey. Adults are on wing in January and November.

Etymology
The name magnus (meaning great, big) reflects the size of the specimen.

References

Moths described in 2011
magnus
Moths of South America